Homorosoma is a genus of minute seed weevils in the family of beetles known as Curculionidae. There are about nine described species in Homorosoma.

Species
These nine species belong to the genus Homorosoma:
 Homorosoma chinense Wagner, 1944 c
 Homorosoma consimile Wagner, 1944 c
 Homorosoma horridula Voss, 1958 c
 Homorosoma klapperichi Wagner, 1944 c
 Homorosoma rhytidosomoides Wagner, 1944 c
 Homorosoma speiseri Friv., 1893 c
 Homorosoma sulcipenne (LeConte, 1876) g b
 Homorosoma sulcipennis (LeConte, 1876) i c
 Homorosoma validirostre (Gyllenhal, 1837) g
Data sources: i = ITIS, c = Catalogue of Life, g = GBIF, b = Bugguide.net

References

Further reading

External links

 

Curculionidae